Hroznětín is a town in Karlovy Vary District in the Karlovy Vary Region of the Czech Republic. It has about 2,100 inhabitants.

Administrative parts
Villages of Bystřice, Odeř, Ruprechtov and Velký Rybník are administrative parts of Hroznětín.

History
The first written mention of Hroznětín is from 1213.

Notable people
Abraham ben Saul Broda (1640–1717), rabbi

References

External links

Populated places in Karlovy Vary District
Cities and towns in the Czech Republic
Shtetls
Towns in the Ore Mountains